"Gypsy (Of a Strange and Distant Time)" is a 1969 song by the progressive rock band the Moody Blues, from their album To Our Children's Children's Children, a concept album about space travel. The song was written by band-member Justin Hayward.

The song was never released as a single, but became a fan and album oriented rock radio favorite, remaining in the band's concert setlist through the 1970s.

Reviewing the album for AllMusic, Bruce Eder said: "There are no extended suites on this album, but Justin Hayward's "Watching and Waiting" and "Gypsy" have proved to be among the most popular songs in the group's history."

Personnel
 Justin Hayward – vocals, acoustic and electric guitars
 John Lodge – bass guitar, backing vocals
 Mike Pinder – Mellotron, backing vocals
 Ray Thomas – bass flute, backing vocals
 Graeme Edge – drums, percussion

References

External links
 

1969 songs
The Moody Blues songs
Songs written by Justin Hayward